Pierre Michel Pujol (born 13 July 1984) is a French professional volleyball player. He is a former member of the France national team, with which he competed at the 2010 World Championship held in Italy. At the professional club level, he plays for Dinamo București.

Honours

Clubs
 CEV Cup
  2010/2011 – with Sisley Treviso

 National championships
 2006/2007  French Championship, with Stade Poitevin Poitiers
 2007/2008  Italian SuperCup, with Sisley Treviso
 2009/2010  French Championship, with AS Cannes
 2017/2018  German Championship, with Berlin Recycling Volleys
 2019/2020  German SuperCup, with Berlin Recycling Volleys
 2019/2020  German Cup, with Berlin Recycling Volleys
 2020/2021  German Championship, with Berlin Recycling Volleys
 2020/2021  German SuperCup, with Berlin Recycling Volleys

References

External links

 
 Player profile at LegaVolley.it 
 Player profile at Volleybox.net

1984 births
Living people
Sportspeople from Bordeaux 
French men's volleyball players
Olympic volleyball players of France
Volleyball players at the 2016 Summer Olympics
French expatriate sportspeople in Italy
Expatriate volleyball players in Italy
French expatriate sportspeople in Poland
Expatriate volleyball players in Poland
French expatriate sportspeople in Germany
Expatriate volleyball players in Germany
French expatriate sportspeople in Romania
Expatriate volleyball players in Romania
AS Cannes Volley-Ball players
Effector Kielce players
BBTS Bielsko-Biała players
Setters (volleyball)